North Swiftcurrent Glacier is a glacier in Glacier National Park in the U.S. state of Montana. North Swiftcurrent Glacier consists of several remnant glaciers and additional ice patches, none of which exceed  in surface area and do not meet the threshold of  often cited as being the minimum size to qualify as an active glacier. The glacier lost over 32 percent of its area between 1966 and 2005.

See also
 List of glaciers in the United States
 Glaciers in Glacier National Park (U.S.)

References

Glaciers of Glacier County, Montana
Glaciers of Glacier National Park (U.S.)
Glaciers of Montana